Ana-Maria Crnogorčević (born 3 October 1990) is a Swiss professional footballer who plays as a winger or a right-back for Spanish Liga F club FC Barcelona and the Switzerland national team. A fast player with good heading ability, she is considered, alongside Ramona Bachmann, one of Switzerland's most talented footballers.

Club career 
Crnogorčević began her club career with FC Steffisburg at age 11. In 2004, she moved to FC Rot-Schwarz Thun, then later to FC Thun. In 2009, she helped Rot-Schwarz win the Swiss Cup final. Crnogorčević scored a hat-trick in the 8–0 win over FC Schlieren. She was the top-scorer with 24 goals in 16 games in the Nationalliga A. In September 2009 she joined German Bundesliga team Hamburger SV. She made her debut for HSV on 27 September, scoring in a 3–2 win against SG Essen-Schönebeck. Crnogorčević finished her first season in Germany with eight goals from 19 appearances. For the 2011/12 season she moved to 1. FFC Frankfurt, with which she won the Champions League in 2015.

She signed with Portland Thorns FC ahead of the 2018 National Women's Soccer League season In December 2019, Crnogorčević signed with Barcelona. She won the Champions League with Barcelona in the 2020–21 season.

International career 
Crnogorčević, who has dual nationality, turned down an approach to play for Croatia when she was 17. Instead she scored 25 goals in 29 games for the Switzerland U19 team. At the 2009 UEFA U19 Championship in Belarus, she reached the semi-final with her team. She was selected in the U20 for the 2012 U20 World Cup in Japan. She played in all three matches but was eliminated in the group stage. On 12 August 2009 she made her debut for the Swiss senior team in a friendly against Sweden. In August 2010, she scored five goals in an 8–0 World Cup qualifying win over Kazakhstan.

Crnogorčević succeeded with the Swiss national team in qualifying for the 2017 European Championship in the Netherlands, where she was top scorer with seven goals. On June 4, 2016, she surpassed previous Swiss all-time goalscorer Lara Dickenmann by adding two goals in a qualifier against the Czech Republic. At the European Championship, she scored a goal in the 1-1 draw with France, but her team was eliminated after the group stage. In the subsequent qualification for the 2019 World Cup, she scored two goals in eleven games. However, the Swiss did not qualify this time because they lost in the last play-off round against European champions Netherlands.

On 13 April 2021, she converted her team's last penalty to 3-2 in the second leg of qualifying play-off for the Euro 2022 against the Czech Republic, succeeding in qualifying for the Euro finals. In the first leg, she scored the goal for the 1-1 equalizer with a penalty in the 90th minute.  In all, she scored six goals in qualifying, once again being her team's top scorer.

On June 30, 2022, Crnogorčević matched Lara Dickenmann's national cap record with her 135th international match in the 4-0 defeat in the European Championship preparatory game against England.  At the European Championship in 2022, she played in all three group games in the starting lineup. Switzerland was eliminated after the preliminary round.

Career statistics

Club summary

International goals

Honours

Club
FC Rot-Schwarz Thun	
 Swiss Cup: Winner, 2009

FFC Frankfurt
 DFB-Pokal: Winner, 2014
 UEFA Women's Champions League: Winner, 2015

Portland Thorns
NWSL Championship: Runner-up, 2018

FC Barcelona
 Primera División: 2019–20, 2020–21, 2021–22
UEFA Women's Champions League: Winner, 2020–21, Runner-up, 2021–22
 Supercopa Femenina: 2019–20, 2021–22
Copa de la Reina: 2019–20, 2020–21, 2021–22

Individual
 Swiss Nationalliga A Top goalscorer: 2009

References

External links 

 Ana-Maria Crnogorčević at UEFA
 Ana-Maria Crnogorčević at FC Barcelona
 Ana-Maria Crnogorčević at Football.ch
 Ana-Maria Crnogorčević at BDFutbol
 
 
 Hamburger SV women's team 
 Interview at dfb.de 
 Photoshoot in Bild 

1990 births
Living people
Swiss women's footballers
Expatriate women's footballers in Germany
Expatriate women's footballers in Spain
Swiss expatriate sportspeople in Germany
Swiss expatriate women's footballers
Swiss expatriate sportspeople in Spain
People from Thun District
Hamburger SV (women) players
1. FFC Frankfurt players
Swiss people of Croatian descent
Switzerland women's international footballers
2015 FIFA Women's World Cup players
Women's association football forwards
Frauen-Bundesliga players
National Women's Soccer League players
Portland Thorns FC players
FIFA Century Club
FC Barcelona Femení players
Sportspeople from the canton of Bern
UEFA Women's Euro 2022 players
UEFA Women's Euro 2017 players